Luis Lindorfo Mayanés Contreras (15 January 1925 – 6 November 1979) was a Chilean football forward who played for Chile in the 1950 FIFA World Cup. He also played for Club Universidad de Chile.

References

External links
FIFA profile

1925 births
1979 deaths
1950 FIFA World Cup players
Association football forwards
Chile international footballers
Chilean footballers
Universidad de Chile footballers